Daspalla State ( was one of the princely states of India during the period of the British Raj. Its capital was Kunjabangarh, located in present-day Nayagarh district, Odisha.

History
The region of Daspalla used to be a part of Baudh State ruled by the kings of Bhanj dynasty. Around the late 1400s, roughly 1498 the Raja of Baudh made his brother Naren Bhanj the chieftain of the region. Eventually due to political intrigues, he seceded from the Baudh kingdom and laid the foundation of the Daspalla kingdom along with help from the neighbouring rulers of Khandpara State.

The state acceded to India in 1948 following independence and the merged into the Nayagarh district of Odisha.

Rulers
The rulers of Daspalla of the Bhanj dynasty:

Naren Bhanja (1498 CE)
...
Chakradhar Deo Bhanja (1653–1701)
Padmanav Deo Bhanja (1701–1753)
Trilochan Deo Bhanja (1753–1775)
Makunda Bhank Deo Bhanja (1775–1795)
Guri Charan Deo Bhanja (1795–1805)
Krishna Chanda Deo Bhanja (1805–1845)
Madhusudan Deo Bhanja (1845–1861)
Narsimha Deo Bhanja (1861–1873)
Chaitan Deo Bhanja (1873–19 April 1897)
Narayan Deo Bhanja (19 April 1897 – 11 Dec 1913)
Kishor Chandra Deo Bhanja (11 December 1913 – 1 January 1948)

Titular
Kishor Chandra Deo Bhanja (1 January 1948 – 16 January 1960)
Purna Chandra Deo Bhanja (16 January 1960–19 June 2006)
Digvijay Deo Bhanja (19 June 2006–current)

See also 
 Eastern States Agency
 Political integration of India

References

Princely states of Odisha
History of Odisha
Nayagarh district
15th-century establishments in India
1498 establishments in Asia
1948 disestablishments in India